Swaraj Mukherjee (1941/42 – 6 April 2003) was an Indian politician belonging to Trinamool Congress. He was elected as a legislator of West Bengal Legislative Assembly from Uttarpara in 2001. He died on 6 April 2003 at the age of 61.

References

1940s births
2003 deaths
Trinamool Congress politicians from West Bengal
Members of the West Bengal Legislative Assembly